Carlisle Armory may refer to:

Carlisle Armory (Carlisle, Kentucky), listed on the National Register of Historic Places in Nicholas County, Kentucky
Carlisle Armory (Carlisle, Pennsylvania), listed on the National Register of Historic Places in Cumberland County, Pennsylvania